Aseel may refer to:

 Aseel (name)
 Aseel (website), an e-commerce platform
 Aseel, a type of ghee

See also 
 Asil (disambiguation)